Bar Wars is an album by saxophonist Willis Jackson which was recorded in 1977 and first released on the Muse label.

Reception 

In his review for AllMusic, Scott Yanow states "This is a particularly exciting release... The chord changes might be fairly basic but Willis Jackson plays with such enthusiasm and exuberance that it almost sounds as if he had discovered the joy of playing music".

Track listing 
All compositions by Willis Jackson except where noted.
 "Later" (Sil Austin, Tiny Bradshaw, Henry Glover) – 5:51
 "Blue and Sentimental" (Count Basie, Mack David, Jerry Livingston) – 2:59
 "Bar Wars" – 6:57
 "The Breeze and I" (Tutti Camarata, Ernesto Lecuona, Al Stillman) – 5:00
 "The Goose Is Loose" – 5:02
 "It's All Right With Me" (Cole Porter) – 7:15
 "The Breeze and I" (Camarata, Lecuona, Stillman) – 5:10
 "It's All Right With Me" (Porter) – 7:03

Personnel 
Willis Jackson – tenor saxophone
Charles Earland – organ
Pat Martino – guitar
Idris Muhammad – drums
Buddy Caldwell – congas, percussion

References 

Willis Jackson (saxophonist) albums
1978 albums
Muse Records albums
Albums recorded at Van Gelder Studio